Czatkobatrachus is an extinct genus of Early Triassic (Olenekian) salientian amphibians. It was first described in 1998 based on fossils found in the  1 quarry in Poland. It is, with Triadobatrachus, one of the two oldest known lissamphibians. More precisely, it is a member of Salientia; it is related to, but outside Anura, the taxon that includes all extant frogs. It is known only from the early Triassic of Poland. Its vertebral column may have been short as in other salientians, but the exact count is unknown. It had a short tail, and an elongated ilium.

See also 
 List of prehistoric amphibian genera

References 

Prehistoric amphibian genera
Olenekian life
Early Triassic animals of Europe
Fossils of Poland
Fossil taxa described in 1998